Waldron Township is an inactive township in Platte County, in the U.S. state of Missouri.

Waldron Township has the name of the local Waldron family.

References

Townships in Missouri
Townships in Platte County, Missouri